The Peruvian pipit (Anthus peruvianus) is a species of bird in the family Motacillidae native to Chile and Peru.

References

Further reading

Anthus
Birds of South America
Birds described in 1878